Florence May Wright Henderson was an American poet active in Salem, Oregon in the early 20th century.

Biography
She was originally from Canada. It was reported that she never attended school or college, but learned to read and write from her mother and from private instructors. She was heralded in various local publications as a rising star rivaling the region's greatest literary figures; her poetry was published in many local and regional newspapers and magazines. She married Albert J. Henderson in 1905. They had children; she died in 1908.

References

Poems by Wright

External links 
 Mention in the Daily Journal, Salem, Oregon
 "most promising poet in the west"
 more praise
 more praise, considered as one of Salem's most promising celebrities
 Oregon Woman's Club poetry
 Relative: Joseph Wright
 Purchased real estate, 1901

Writers from Salem, Oregon
Poets from Oregon
Year of birth unknown
1908 deaths
American women poets